Gloucester Courthouse is a census-designated place (CDP) in and the county seat of Gloucester County, Virginia, United States. The population was 2,951 at the 2010 census.

History
The Gloucester County Courthouse Square Historic District, Gloucester Downtown Historic District, Abingdon Glebe House, Airville, Burgh Westra, Cappahosic House, Gloucester Point Archaeological District, Gloucester Women's Club, Hockley, Little England, Roaring Spring, Rosewell, Toddsbury, T.C. Walker House, Ware Parish Church, and Warner Hall are listed on the National Register of Historic Places.

Geography
According to the United States Census Bureau, the CDP has a total area of 7.2 square miles (18.6 km2), of which, 7.0 square miles (18.1 km2) of it is land and 0.2 square miles (0.5 km2) of it (2.78%) is water.

Demographics
As of the census of 2000, there were 2,269 people, 857 households, and 561 families residing in the CDP. The population density was 324.7 people per square mile (125.3/km2). There were 907 housing units at an average density of 129.8/sq mi (50.1/km2). The racial makeup of the CDP was 86.78% White, 10.67% African American, 0.48% Native American, 0.26% Asian, 0.48% from other races,1.00% of households had 7 people., and 1.32% from two or more races. Hispanic or Latino of any race were 1.15% of the population.

There were 857 households, out of which 28.1% had children under the age of 18 living with them, 51.3% were married couples living together, 11.0% had a female householder with no husband present, and 34.5% were non-families. 30.6% of all households were made up of individuals, and 15.5% had someone living alone who was 65 years of age or older. The average household size was 2.28 and the average family size was 2.82.

In the CDP, the population was spread out, with 20.0% under the age of 18, 5.5% from 18 to 24, 23.7% from 25 to 44, 23.8% from 45 to 64, and 27.1% who were 65 years of age or older. The median age was 46 years. For every 100 females, there were 75.2 males. For every 100 females age 18 and over, there were 71.3 males.

The median income for a household in the CDP was $40,292, and the median income for a family was $56,406. Males had a median income of $43,971 versus $26,477 for females. The per capita income for the CDP was $20,749. About 4.3% of families and 6.2% of the population were below the poverty line, including 6.2% of those under age 18 and 1.9% of those age 65 or over.

References

External links

Census-designated places in Gloucester County, Virginia
Census-designated places in Virginia
County seats in Virginia